Cerobasis is a genus of granary booklice in the family Trogiidae. There are at least 30 described species in Cerobasis.

Species
These 30 species belong to the genus Cerobasis:

 Cerobasis albipes Lienhard, 1996 c g
 Cerobasis alfredi Lienhard, 1984 c g
 Cerobasis alpha Garcia Aldrete, 1993 c g
 Cerobasis amorosa Lienhard, 1995 c g
 Cerobasis annulata (Hagen, 1865) i c g b
 Cerobasis atlantica Lienhard, 2011 c g
 Cerobasis australica (Enderlein, 1907) c g
 Cerobasis caboverdensis Lienhard, 1984 c g
 Cerobasis canariensis (Enderlein, 1910) c g
 Cerobasis captiva Garcia Aldrete, 1988 c g
 Cerobasis clarionensis Garcia Aldrete, 1993 c g
 Cerobasis denticulata Lienhard, 1996 c g
 Cerobasis ericacea Baz, 1993 c g
 Cerobasis guestfalica (Kolbe, 1880) i c g b
 Cerobasis harteni Lienhard, 1984 c g
 Cerobasis insularis Lienhard, 1996 c g
 Cerobasis intermedia Lienhard, 1984 c g
 Cerobasis lambda Thornton & A. K. T. Woo, 1973 c g
 Cerobasis lapidicola Garcia Aldrete, 1993 c g
 Cerobasis lineata Mockford, 2012 c g
 Cerobasis longicornis Baz, 1993 c g
 Cerobasis maculiceps Badonnel, 1967 c g
 Cerobasis maderensis Lienhard, 1983 c g
 Cerobasis maya Garcia Aldrete, 1991 c g
 Cerobasis nigra Lienhard, 1996 c g
 Cerobasis pineticola Baz, 1991 c g
 Cerobasis recta Thornton & A. K. T. Woo, 1973 c g
 Cerobasis rosae Baz, 1993 c g
 Cerobasis socotrae Lienhard, 1995 c g
 Cerobasis treptica Thornton & A. K. T. Woo, 1973 c g

Data sources: i = ITIS, c = Catalogue of Life, g = GBIF, b = Bugguide.net

References

Further reading

 

Trogiidae